Silent Partner is a 2001 Australian film directed by Alkinos Tsilimidos and starring David Field and Syd Brisbane.

Plot summary

Cast
 David Field as John
 Syd Brisbane as Bill
 Hebe as Silent Partner
 Les Andrews as Gatekeeper

References

External links
 
 
 
 Silent Partner at Urban Cinefile
 Silent Partner review at Variety
 Silent Partner at Oz Movies

Australian comedy-drama films
2000s English-language films
2000s Australian films